Savski Marof is a naselje (settlement) in the municipality of Brdovec, Zagreb County, Croatia. This makes it the least dense settlement and the smallest by population in Brdovec. It is second-smallest by area (after Harmica).

References 

Populated places in Zagreb County